Dizgaran (also Romanized as Dīzgarān and Dīzgerān; also known as Yazgarān) is a village in Poshtdarband Rural District, in the Central District of Kermanshah County, Kermanshah Province, Iran. At the 2006 census, its population was 171, in 43 families.

References 

Populated places in Kermanshah County